The Danish Minister for Holstein and Lauenburg was a Danish ministry that existed from 1852 to 1864. It dealt with the duchies of Holstein and Lauenburg within the Unitary State.

List of ministers

References

Government ministerial offices of Denmark
Ministries established in 1852
1864 disestablishments in Denmark
Government agencies disestablished in 1864